Jean Odoutan (born in 1965) is a comedian, film director, composer, actor, screenwriter and executive movie producer from the African country of Benin. He is also the creator of a film festival, the Quintessence International Film Festival of Ouidah.

Early life
Odoutan moved to Paris, France as a teenager, at the age of fifteen in 1980. Soon after, he began working in the film industry.

Filmography
Jean Odoutan has been involved in many films, either as actor, director or producer. Many of his movies have been critically acclaimed and he has been guest of honor at many film festivals, including the 2001 Reunion Film Festival. Among the movies he has participated are:

Barbecue Pejo (2000)
Djib (2000, as director and screenwriter)
La Valse des Gros Derrieres (2004, as director and screenwriter)

References

External links

1965 births
Living people
Film people from Paris
Beninese male actors
Beninese film directors
Beninese screenwriters
French people of Beninese descent
French male actors
French screenwriters